A bodysuit is a one-piece form-fitting or skin-tight garment that covers the torso and the crotch, and sometimes the legs, hands, and feet, and cannot be used as a swimsuit. The style of a basic bodysuit is similar to a one-piece swimsuit and a leotard, though the materials may vary. A bodysuit, unlike a swimsuit or leotard, has snaps, hooks or velcro at the crotch. Thong or T-front thong bodysuits usually have the crotch opening moved up to the front to underbelly area to increase the wearer's comfort. A bodysuit may have sleeves and varying shoulder strap and collar styles. Bodysuits can be made from a number of fabrics, including cotton, lace, nylon, etc. In general, textile bodysuits include expandable fiber such as spandex for a better fit to the shape of the body.

A bodysuit is normally worn with trousers or a skirt. The top, torso part may act as a top for the smooth line it gives or because it cannot become untucked from trousers or skirt. They may also be worn generally by women as underwear, activewear, or foundation garments. Unlike a leotard, a bodysuit is not usually considered a form of athletic wear. Onesies (or snapsuits) are bodysuits for younger children, toddlers, and some adults that help keep diapers in place. The purpose of the opening at the crotch is to facilitate access to a baby's diaper or for a visit to the toilet.

There are also bodyshirts, like the counterpart to the bodysuit, they are loose-fitting garments that cover the whole torso, with sleeves in short to long lengths and crotch snaps. The difference is that they look like a shirt on the top portion of the garment, and may have a different stretch fabric in the waist to the crotch area to make them fit better. Cheerleaders also wear long sleeved crew neck and turtleneck bodysuits as part of their uniform.

History
The bodysuit was a progression from the leotard. It was presented in the United States after 1950 by fashion designer Claire McCardell. It was worn as a blouse or T-shirt. The first recognized bodysuit was worn by Bettie Page in the 1950s, and was a trademark attire of the Playboy Bunnies from the 1960s, as well as Wonder Woman in the animated series Super Friends and Lynda Carter's television series. 

Azzedine Alaia and Donna Karan helped make the bodysuit a fashion item for both men, women and even tweens, teens, and young adult/college age in the 1980s to mid 1990s seen a lot in short cap sleeved or turtleneck versions worn in popular fashion style as a top especially with high waisted jeans and also with regular and dress shorts and skirts. After a slowdown, it was resurrected as shaping underwear or lingerie, and in the 2010s it reappeared as a blouse bodysuit, cap sleeve style, and classic turtleneck bodysuit, as well as a part of evening wear.

See also

 Bodystocking
 Catsuit
 Corset
 Fatsuit
 Girdle
 Infant bodysuit
 Jumpsuit
 Leotard
 Morphsuits
 Negligee
 Romper suit
 Tank suit
 Teddy (garment)
 T-front
 Unitard
 Zentai

References

External links
 

1980s fashion
2010s fashion
Costume design
Fetish clothing
Lingerie
One-piece suits